Arnold-Harrell House is a historic house in Murfreesboro, Tennessee, U.S..

History
The house was built in 1861 for Edwin Arnold and his wife Harriet McLanahan.  During the American Civil War, their daughter Mary Dean was accidentally shot in the house by the [Union Army] but recovered.  By 1862, the house had been ransacked.

The house was purchased by Reuben C. Harrell in 1895.  His grandson, Henry Harrell, sold some of the land on the property to build more houses in 1940–1955.

Architectural significance
The house was designed in the Italianate and architectural styles.  It has been listed on the National Register of Historic Places since March 27, 1992.

References

Buildings and structures in Murfreesboro, Tennessee
Georgian architecture in Tennessee
Houses completed in 1861
Houses on the National Register of Historic Places in Tennessee
Italianate architecture in Tennessee